Lasha Lomidze (born 26 January 2000) is a Georgian rugby union player. He plays as Fly-half for AIA Kutaisi in Georgia Championship Didi 10 and Georgia national rugby union team.
He was called in Georgia U20 squad for 2017 World Rugby Under 20 Championship.

References

2000 births
Living people
Rugby union players from Georgia (country)
Sportspeople from Georgia (country)
The Black Lion players
Rugby union centres
Rugby union fly-halves